Frank Holden may refer to:
 Frankie J. Holden, Australian singer, actor and TV presenter
 Frank Holden (footballer), Australian rules footballer 
 Frank Howell Holden, American architect